Kilgore Creek is a  long 2nd order tributary to Hyco Creek in Caswell County, North Carolina.

Course
Kilgore Creek rises about 0.5 miles south of Leasburg, North Carolina, and then flows northerly to join Hyco Creek about 2 miles northwest of Leasburg.

Watershed
Kilgore Creek drains  of area, receives about 46.3 in/year of precipitation, has a wetness index of 394.23, and is about 62% forested.

References

Rivers of North Carolina
Rivers of Caswell County, North Carolina
Tributaries of the Roanoke River